Valerianella nuttallii, or Nuttall's cornsalad, is a small dicot annual plant of the family Caprifoliaceae which can be found growing within the United States in areas of Oklahoma and Arkansas.

References

Flora of the United States
nuttallii